There have been fourteen popes named Clement.

Pope Clement I saint, (88–98)
Pope Clement II (1046–1047)
Pope Clement III (1187–1191)
Pope Clement IV (1265–1268)
Pope Clement V (1305–1314)
Pope Clement VI (1342–1352)
Pope Clement VII (1523–1534)
Pope Clement VIII (1592–1605)
Pope Clement IX (1667–1669)
Pope Clement X (1670–1676)
Pope Clement XI (1700–1721)
Pope Clement XII (1730–1740)
Pope Clement XIII (1758–1769)
Pope Clement XIV (1769–1774)

There have also been three antipopes named Clement.

Antipope Clement III (1080–1085)
Antipope Clement VII (1378–1394)
Antipope Clement VIII (1423–1429)

Clement